Eagle Creek is a long meandering stream running through several counties in central Kentucky in the United States. It is a tributary of the Kentucky River, the confluence of which is near Worthville in Carroll County.

Features

See also
List of rivers of Kentucky

References

Rivers of Kentucky
Wild and Scenic Rivers of the United States
Rivers of Carroll County, Kentucky
Rivers of Owen County, Kentucky
Rivers of Gallatin County, Kentucky
Rivers of Scott County, Kentucky
Rivers of Grant County, Kentucky